Jorge Cermesoni (16 August 1908 – December 2002) was an Argentine fencer. He competed in the individual and team sabre events at the 1948.

References

1908 births
2002 deaths
Argentine male fencers
Argentine sabre fencers
Olympic fencers of Argentina
Fencers at the 1948 Summer Olympics
Fencers from Buenos Aires